Best Kept Secret is an American music production duo, composed of record producers Julian Nixon and Craig Balmoris. The duo met in 2006, during their time in high school. Former member Ernest "Tone P" Price was a part of Best Kept Secret from 2007 until 2009. Craig Balmoris recently won a Grammy for best rap album for his contributions on Kendrick Lamar’s “  Mr. Morale & the Big Steppers 

Infusing go-go with hip hop, Best Kept Secret connected with fellow DC native, Wale, to produce the majority of his critically acclaimed mixtape, The Mixtape About Nothing. They would later team up with Clarence "CJ" Mitchell aka "Flawless Tracks" to create one of the most popular SoundClick pages. The SoundClick production is often heard with the producer tag, "Hey it's the Best Kept Secret", and can be found on many Ballislife.com videos and other popular internet content.

Production discography

Wale – 100 Miles & Running (2007) 
 02. "DC Gorillaz"
 03. "Ice Cream Girl"

Rhymefest – Mark Ronson Presents: Man In The Mirror (2008) 
 02. "Can't Make It"
 07. "Never Can Say Goodbye" ft. Talib Kweli

Wale – The Mixtape About Nothing (2008) 
 01. "The Opening Title Sequence"
 03. "The Feature Heavy Song" ft. Bun B, Pusha T and Tre from UCB
 05. "The Perfect Plan"
 06. "The Kramer"
 07. "The Crazy"
 08. "Vacation from Ourselves"
 10. "The Grown Up"
 11. “The Manipulation"
 12. "Artistic Integrity"
 18. "The Hype"
 19. "The End Credits"

Robin Thicke – Miscellaneous (2008) 
 "Magic"  Remix ft. Mary J. Blige and Wale Co- Produced w/ Mark Ronson

Rhymefest – El Che (2008) 
 02. "Talk My Shit"

Wale – Back to the Feature (2009) 
 08. "Sweatin Out Weaves" ft. UCB 
 22. "New Soul" ft. Yael Naim

Young Chris – 30 Days 30 Verses (2009) 
 16. "Searching" ft. Bun B and Wale

Skyzoo – The Salvation (2009) 
 04. "My Interpretation"

Wale – Attention Deficit (2009) 
 04. "Pretty Girls" ft. Gucci Mane & Weensey
 08. "Shades" ft. Chrisette Michele
 14. "Prescription"

Wale - Miscellaneous (2009) 
 "Family Affair"
 "Pretty Girls  (Remix)" ft. Fabolous and Chris Brown

Logic - Young, Broke & Infamous (2010) 
 14. "Ask Em"

Shawty Lo - Miscellaneous (2010) 
 "Say Yeah" ft. Snoop Dogg

Wale – More About Nothing (2010) 
 03. "The Soup"
 21. "The Get Away (Fly Away) ft. Northeast Groovers"

Mike Posner – The Layover (2011) 
 12. "21 Days"
 13. "Attitudes" ft. Casey Veggies

Nipsey Hussle - TMC: X-Tra Laps (2012) 
 01. "Faith"

Kendrick Lamar and Jay Rock - The Vault (2012) 
 "Hands Up"

Schoolboy Q – Habits & Contradictions (2012) 
03. "Hands on the Wheel" ft. ASAP Rocky
Sample credit: "Pursuit of Happiness" - Lissie

Skyzoo - A Dream Deferred (2012) 
 11. "How to Make It Through Hysteria"

Tinashe - Reverie (2012) 
 05. "Another Me"

Epic Rap Battles of History (Season 2) (2013) 
 Ep. 28 "Adam vs Eve" ft. Jenna Marbles

Tinashe - Black Water (2013) 
 06. "Midnight Sun"

Wale - (2014) 
 "Royals (Remix)" ft. Magazeen

Rittz - Next to Nothing (2014) 
 08. "In My Zone" ft. Mike Posner and B.o.B
 12. "Going Through Hell" ft. Mike Posner

Teyana Taylor - VII (2014) 
 02. "Just Different"

Wale - Festivus (2014) 
 09. "Chess" ft. Jerry Seinfeld

Tabi Bonney - Miscellaneous (2014) 
 "Poom Poom"

Estelle - True Romance (2015) 
 05. "Timeshare (Suite 509)"

Wale - The Album About Nothing (2015) 
 12. "The Bloom (AG3)"

Cyhi the Prynce - (2015) 
 "Elephant in the Room"

Dr. Dre - Compton (2015) 
 06. "Darkside" ft. King Mez

Rittz - Top of the Line (2016) 
 05. "Inside of the Groove" ft. Mike Posner and E-40

Wale - (2016) 
 "Heisman Watch"

Jidenna - The Chief (2017) 
 06. "Long Live the Chief"

SZA - Ctrl (2017) 
 08. "Garden (Say It like Dat)"

Bekon - Get With the Times (2018) 
 01. "7am"
 02. "America"
 03. "Cold As Ice"
 04. "9am"
 05. "Oxegen"
 06. "Catch Me If You Can"
 07. "Mama Olivia"
 08. "12pm"
 09. "17"
 10. "30"
 11. "4pm"
 12. "Get With The Times"
 13. "7pm"
 14. "Candy and Promises"
 15. "10pm Soda Break"
 16. "In Your Honor"

Lolawolf - (2018) 
 "Baby I'm Dyin'"

Marsha Ambrosius - Nyla (2018) 
 09. "Today" (produced with Focus...)
 13. "Scorn"

H.E.R. - I Used to Know Her: Part 2 (2018) 
 07. "Fate"
 08. "Lord is Coming"

Wale - Miscellaneous (2019) 
 "09 Folarin"

Higher Brothers - Five Stars (Higher Brothers album) (2019) 
 "Do It Like Me" ft. JID

Rich Brian - The Sailor (2019) 
 01. "The Sailor"
 02. "Rapapapa" ft. RZA
 04. "Kids"
 05. "Drive Safe"
 06. "Confetti"
 07. "Vacant"
 08. "No Worries"
 11. "Curious"
 12. "Where Does the Time Go" ft. Joji

H.E.R. - I Used to Know Her (2019) 
 02. "Fate"
 19. "Lord is Coming" ft. YBN Cordae

Rich Brian - Miscellaneous (2020) 
 "Bali" ft. Guapdad 4000

Rich Brian - 1999 (2020) 
 "Love in My Pocket"

Joji - Nectar (2020) 
  01. "Ew"

Shang-Chi and the Legend of the Ten Rings: The Album (2021)
  01. "Always Rising" (performed by Niki, Rich Brian, and Warren Hue)
  02. "Diamonds + and Pearls" (performed by DPR Live, DPR Ian and peace.)
  07. "Lose Control" (performed by JJ Lin)
  10. "Foolish" (performed by Rich Brian, Warren Hue, and Guapdad 4000)
  12. "Act Up" (performed by Rich Brian and EarthGang)
  17. "Hot Soup" (performed by 88rising and Simu Liu)
  18. "Warriors" (performed by Warren Hue and Seori)

Tanna Leone - "Sleepy Soldier" (2022) 
  13. "If There's A God"
  14. "February"

Kendrick Lamar - Mr. Morale & the Big Steppers (2022) 
  06. "Auntie Diaries"
  09. "Mirror"

Fousheé - Softcore (2022) 
  08. "Unexplainable"

References 

American musical duos
Record production duos
Record producers from Washington, D.C.
Musicians from Washington, D.C.
Musical groups established in 2007